Roberto Augusto Ulloa (March 1, 1924 – December 8, 2020) was an Argentine politician and captain in the Argentine Navy. He was a Governor of Salta Province for two tenures: 1977 to 1983 (de facto) and 1991 to 1995. He was the founder and leader of the Salta Renewal Party, a regional conservative party based in Salta Province.

Ulloa died in Buenos Aires on December 8, 2020, at the age of 96.

References

1924 births
2020 deaths 
Argentine Navy officers
Governors of Salta Province
Members of the Argentine Senate for Salta
Members of the Argentine Chamber of Deputies elected in Salta
Salta Renewal Party politicians